Ricardo Luciano Kip (born 15 March 1992) is a Dutch professional footballer who plays as a midfielder for Oțelul Galați.

Club career

Ajax
Kip was born in Zoetermeer. The son of a Dutch father and a mother of Italian descent, he was recruited to play in the youth ranks of Ajax at age 11. He since represented Ajax on every youth level, before signing a one-year contract with the club on 30 May 2011. Playing his first year on the reserve squad of Jong Ajax, without making any appearances for the first team, Kip's contract was not renewed before the upcoming season, and he subsequently moved to Almere City FC as a free transfer in the summer of 2013.

Almere City
Signing a two-year contract with the club from Flevoland, binding him until 2015, Kip made his Eerste Divisie debut on 10 August 2012, in the 0–2 home loss to Go Ahead Eagles. He made his debut in the KNVB Cup in the second round for Almere City against ADO '20, a match which ended in a 4–1 loss in Heemskerk.

Fleetwood Town
He was released by Fleetwood at the end of the 2017–18 season, after making one appearance as a substitute. He had also been sent on loan at Cambuur before his release.

Later career
Kip returned to Almere City on a two-year contract in June 2018. In September 2020, Kip signed with Super League Greece 2 club Doxa Drama.

International career
Kip gained three caps for the Netherlands national under-17 team, making his international debut on 25 October 2008 in a friendly against Latvia.

References

Living people
1992 births
Footballers from Zoetermeer
Association football midfielders
Dutch footballers
Eerste Divisie players
English Football League players
Almere City FC players
Fleetwood Town F.C. players
SC Cambuur players
Doxa Drama F.C. players
Liga II players
ASC Oțelul Galați players
Dutch expatriate footballers
Expatriate footballers in Greece
Dutch expatriate sportspeople in Greece
Expatriate footballers in England
Expatriate footballers in Romania
Dutch expatriate sportspeople in England
Dutch expatriate sportspeople in Romania
Netherlands youth international footballers
Dutch people of Italian descent